John Sumner (born 14 October 1951) is an English character actor.

Biography
Sumner was born in Blackpool, Lancashire, England. His acting career started in 1992 when he appeared in The Rainbow Warrior. Other film credits include Every Woman's Dream, King Kong, The Tommyknockers, The Frighteners, The Chosen, Whale Rider, Maiden Voyage, Perfect Creature, Atomic Twister, The Other Side of Heaven, Power Rangers RPM, Power Rangers Dino Charge and Power Rangers Ninja Steel.

Filmology
Power Rangers RPM (2009) as Fresno Bob
Power Rangers Dino Charge (2015) as Santa Claus
Power Rangers Super Dino Charge (2016) as Santa Claus
Power Rangers Ninja Steel (2017) as Santa Claus
Power Rangers Super Ninja Steel (2018) as Santa Claus
Power Rangers Beast Morphers (2019) as Santa Claus

External links 

1951 births
English male film actors
Living people
People from Blackpool
Male actors from Lancashire